Rehamna or Rhamna is a province in the Moroccan region of Marrakesh-Safi. Its population in 2014 was 315,077.

Subdivisions
The 23 rural communes are attached to 7 caidats, themselves part of 2 circles:
 circle of Rehamna 
 caidat of Oulad Tmim: Jaafra, Sidi Abdallah and Skoura Lhadra
 caidat of Skhour: Sidi Ghanem, Sidi Mansour and Skhour Rehamna
 caidat of Labrikiyne: Sidi Ali Labrahla, Oulad Hassoune Hamri and Labrikiyne
 caidat of Tnine Bouchane: Oulad Aamer Tizmarine, Ait Hammou, Bouchane and Ait Taleb 
 circle of Sidi Bou Othmane
 caidat of Sidi Bou Othmane: Bourrous, Sidi Boubker and Jbilate
 caidat of Louta: Nzalat Laadam, Lamharra and Oulad Imloul
 caidat of Ras El Aïn: Akarma, Tlauh, Jaidate and Ras Ain Rhamna

References

 
Rehamna Province